Makes Me Sick is the ninth studio album by American rock band New Found Glory. It was released on April 28, 2017, through Hopeless Records.

Background
In October 2016, Alternative Press reported that the group were working on a new album.

Release
The band sent out cryptic messages teasing the album and on January 25, 2017, Makes Me Sick was announced for release in April. The lead single, "Happy Being Miserable", was released on February 16. The music video, filmed in January, was directed by Max Moore and is a recreation of a famous scene from the film Stand by Me. Between March and May, the group went on an anniversary tour to celebrate 20 years of being a band. On the tour, the group performed material from their 1999–2009 albums, as well as "Happy Being Miserable". Gilbert said tour would be "making people aware" of their new album and that for their "future tours we will jam more" songs from the album. On April 14, "Party on Apocalypse" was made available for streaming. A music video was released for it, directed by Moore.Makes Me Sick was released on April 28 through Hopeless Records. In September, the band performed at Riot Fest.

On September 7, a music video was released for "The Sound of Two Voices", directed by Moore. On December 1, a music video was released for "20 Years from Now", an outtake from the Makes Me Sick sessions. The clip consisted of footage from the previous 20 years of the group's existence. Additionally, the track was also released as a single. In May and June, the band embarked on the Sick Tour in the US, with support from Bayside, the Movielife and former Yellowcard frontman William Ryan Key. On May 17, a music video was released for "Call Me Anti-Social", directed by Moore. The album was re-released as a deluxe edition, Makes Me Sick Again, on May 18, 2018. On June 11, a music video was released for "Heaven Sent", directed by Paris Visone. Later in the month, the band headlining their own festival, BreakFest. In early August, the band performed on the 2018 Warped Tour. On August 15, a music video was released for "Barbed Wire", directed by Visone.

Critical reception

Makes Me Sick received mostly positive reviews from music critics. At Metacritic, which assigns a normalized rating out of 100 to reviews from mainstream critics, the album has an average score of 67 based on 5 reviews, indicating "generally favorable reviews." Neil Z. Yeung of AllMusic stated that the album is for "diehards who have grown with the band over the decades, this softer and more buoyant sound should be a welcome maturation."

Track listing

Personnel
Credits adapted from AllMusic.

New Found Glory
Jordan Pundik – lead vocals
Chad Gilbert – guitars, backing vocals
Ian Grushka – bass guitar
Cyrus Bolooki – drums, percussion

Technical
 David Bean – photography
 Brian Butler – artwork/layout
 Troy Glessner – mastering
 Tom Lord-Alge – mixing
 Aaron Mlasko – drum technician
 Aaron Sprinkle – engineer, producer
 Lee Unfried – drum engineering

Charts

References

2017 albums
New Found Glory albums
Albums produced by Aaron Sprinkle
Hopeless Records albums